Robert Glenn Froese (born June 30, 1958) is a Canadian former professional ice hockey goaltender who played eight seasons in the National Hockey League (NHL) for the Philadelphia Flyers and New York Rangers.

Early life 
Froese was born in St. Catharines, Ontario, Canada. He was the middle child to Frank and Agnes Froese with sisters Dorothy (elder) and Patti (younger).

Playing career

Junior and minor leagues 
At 16 Froese made his Ontario Major Junior Hockey League debut for his hometown St. Catharines Blackhawks, having been protected as a homegrown player instead of entering the OMJHL draft. His rookie campaign he played in 15 games. Bob played all four of his junior years for the Emms family, moving across the Niagara Region to the Niagara Falls Flyers for the latter two. Following the 1977–78 season, Froese was drafted by the St Louis Blues in the 10th round, 160th overall.

Due to the Blue's financial woes, Froese was not offered a contract out of junior, but instead signed for the Saginaw Gears of the International Hockey League. Halfway through his rookie IHL campaign, Froese was loaned to the Milwaukee Admirals, where he led them to a playoff berth. Froese played a total of three seasons in Saginaw, culminating with the 1980–81 Turner Cup.

1981–82 saw Froese sign with the Philadelphia Flyers, who placed him with the Maine Mariners. Froese played 33 AHL games for the Mariners in each of the 1981–82 and 1982–83 seasons. His call-up to the NHL came after Pelle Lindbergh injured his wrist in an exhibition game against a travelling Soviet exhibition team.

Philadelphia Flyers 
Froese made his NHL debut on January 8, 1983, against the Hartford Whalers. The Flyers won 7–4. Froese went on to win his first 8 NHL starts and go undefeated for his first 13, compiling a 12–0–1 record along the way. These were both records for a rookie goaltender at the time. His first NHL shutout came in his third game against the New York Rangers.

The 1983–84 season saw Froese lead the Flyers in games played. 1984–85 saw injuries limit Froese to 17 NHL games along with 4 AHL games for the Hershey Bears. In the 1984–85 playoffs, Froese made 1 start and came in 3 times in relief as the Flyers went to the Stanley Cup finals.

After Pelle Lindbergh died early in the 1985–86 season, Froese became the Flyers' starting goalie. Froese was selected as the Wales Conference backup goaltender for the 1986 All-Star Game, leading the Wales Conference to an overtime victory. At the close of this season he shared the William M. Jennings Trophy (for backstopping the team that gave up the fewest goals) with Darren Jensen. Froese also came second in Vezina Trophy voting to John Vanbiesbrouck by only two votes. During this season he led the NHL in save % (.909), shutouts (5), wins (31) and was named to the NHL Second All-Star Team.

1986–87 saw Froese lose the starting job for the Flyers to Ron Hextall. After appearing in only 3 games for the Flyers that season, he was traded to the New York Rangers on December 19, 1986, for Kjell Samuelsson and a second-round draft pick.

New York Rangers 
Following his trade to the Rangers, Froese became half of one of the best tandems in the NHL along with the man he lost the Vezina Trophy to the year before, John Vanbiesbrouck. Appearing in only 28 games that season for the Rangers, he set the team record for most penalty minutes in a season, with 56. Following the season and the Rangers' early exit from the playoffs, Froese went to the IIHF World Championships in Vienna, Austria, where he shut out the Soviet Union during a 0–0 tie.

On November 29, 1987, Froese briefly became the second NHL goalie to score a goal in a game. An errant pass by the New York Islanders' Brent Sutter slid the length of the ice and into the Islanders' empty net on a delayed penalty call. Froese, who had appeared to make a save seconds earlier, was given credit for the goal. Later reviews showed that the shot had actually hit the post and not Froese, so the goal was given to David Shaw.

Altogether, he played for a total of eight seasons, appearing in 242 games and winning 128.

Coaching career 
Following his career, Froese joined the New York Rangers coaching staff as their goaltending consultant, working primarily with young prospects Mike Richter and Corey Hirsch. Following two years on the Rangers staff, he joined the New York Islanders in the same role. After three years on the Islanders staff, Froese stepped away from hockey to pursue ministry full-time.

Personal life 
Froese is married to his high school sweetheart Ruth.

Career statistics

Regular season and playoffs

International

References

External links
 

1958 births
Living people
Canadian ice hockey goaltenders
Canadian people of German descent
Hershey Bears players
Sportspeople from St. Catharines
Maine Mariners players
Milwaukee Admirals (IHL) players
National Hockey League All-Stars
New York Rangers players
Niagara Falls Flyers players
Oshawa Generals players
Philadelphia Flyers players
Saginaw Gears players
St. Catharines Black Hawks players
St. Louis Blues draft picks
William M. Jennings Trophy winners
Ice hockey people from Ontario